Francisca Nneka Okeke is a Nigerian physicist. She is a Professor of Physics at the University of Nigeria, Nsukka and first female head of a department in the University.

Biography 
She hails from Idemili North in Anambra State. She earned a Bachelors of Science in Physics (1980), a Masters of Science in science education (1985), a Masters of Science in Applied Earth Geophysics (1989), and a Ph.D. in Ionospheric Geophysics (1995), from the University of Nigeria. She carried out her postdoctoral work at the University of Tokyo, Japan.

Okeke was the Head of Department of Physics and Astronomy at the University of Nigeria, Nsukka from 2003 to 2006 and was the Dean of the Faculty of Physical Sciences from 2008 to 2010.  She was the first woman to hold both positions. Additionally, Okeke was the first female professor of physics in the eastern part of Nigeria. During her time as head of department, she advocated for inclusion of more women in the department, which led to the hiring of three new female faculty members and as dean of the faculty she prioritised employing women in faculty positions in the physical sciences. She advocates for the wider participation of women and girls in science and technology. 

In 2011, she was elected as fellow of the Nigerian Academy of Science, the highest scientific organization in Nigeria. She was inducted into the academy alongside Abba Gumel, a Professor of Mathematical biology and fellow of the African Academy of Sciences.

Scientific research
Okeke has dedicated much of her career to studying the ionosphere and the “equatorial electrojet phenomenon.” Energized by the sun, the electrojet is a river of electric current that traverses the globe eastward around the dip equator and causes the magnetic field at the dip equator to vary almost five times more than anywhere else on the planet. (The dip or magnetic equator differs from the equator by a few degrees, as the Earth's magnetic north pole is different from what we generally think of as the north pole.) Okeke's research interests include geomagnetism, atmospheric physics, and climate variability.

Okeke's research on how solar activity in the ionosphere affects the Earth's magnetic field could lead to a better understanding of climate change and help pinpoint sources of dramatic phenomena like tsunamis and earthquakes. 

She has successfully supervised 12 Ph.D. and about 28 M.Sc. students. In 2010, one of her Female PhD students, Theresa Obiekezie, won an AU-TWAS young scientist Award.

Awards
She was named L'Oréal-UNESCO For Women in Science Awards Laureate for Africa and Arab States in 2013 for her significant contributions to the understanding of daily variations of the ion currents in the upper atmosphere which may further our understanding of climate change. Okeke was cited as one of the Top 100 most influential Africans by New African magazine in 2013.

Personal life
At age 18 Francisca married physicist Pius Nwankwo Okeke. The couple has six children.

Membership of professional bodies 
• Fellow, Nigerian Academy of Science, FAS.

• Fellow, Japanese Society for Promotion of Science, FJSPS 

• Fellow, Nigeria Institute of Physics, FNIP. 

• Member, Governing Council of ANSTI. 

• Member of Jury: Regional Fellowship for women in science in sub Saharan Africa. 

• ASEG Australian Society of Exploration Geophysicists

• AAWS African Association of Women Society

• OWSD Organization of Women in Science for the Developing world

• AGU American Geophysical Union 

• NIP Nigerian Institute of Physics 

• SAN Science Association of Nigeria. 

• IAU International Astronomical Union 

• Past Board member, INWES, International Network of Women Engineers and Scientists. Member, WIP, Women in Physics 

● SGEPSS Society of Geomagnetism and Earth, Planetary and Space Sciences

● ANSTI African Network for Science and Technological Institution, Governing Council Member

References

Living people
Nigerian scientists
Academic staff of the University of Nigeria
People from Onitsha
L'Oréal-UNESCO Awards for Women in Science laureates
21st-century women scientists
Year of birth missing (living people)
Fellows of the Nigerian Academy of Science